is a Japanese anime television series based on DeNA's news app Hacka Doll for iOS and Android devices. The anime is produced by Creators in Pack, with collaboration support by Trigger. The series of anime shorts aired on October 2, 2015, in Japan as part of the Ultra Super Anime Time programming block, alongside Kagewani and Miss Monochrome: The Animation 3 and finished on December 25, 2015. The series was simulcast by Crunchyroll.

Plot

In the near future in the current 21st century, the media is saturated with information, making it impossible to discern the correct needs of people and their problems. In this context, the story revolves around the Hacka Dolls, robots with an AI system created for the help and personal entertainment of its users. Their AI application program is synchronized with a user, allowing the user to automatically analyze the tastes and preferences of the user and then offer their personal help service or make recommendations to improve those needs. Three of these Hacka Dolls are clumsy, which will open the way to the development of the plot.

Characters

Main characters

Supporting characters

Production
The anime is directed by Ikuo Geso who also served as storyboarder, animation director, editor, designer, and digital painter for the anime. Creators in Pack is the main animation studio, and production assistance was provided by Trigger. The Hacka Doll's main three voice actresses (Miyu Takagi, Kaya Okuno, and Nanami Yamashita) sing the anime's opening theme "Touch Tap Baby" and ending theme "Happy Days Refrain".

Episode list

References

External links
Anime official website 
News app official website 

2015 anime television series debuts
Creators in Pack
DeNA
DeNA franchises
Shōnen manga
Tokyo MX original programming
Studio Trigger